Postal codes in Montserrat are used by the Montserrat Postal Service to route mail to groups of post office boxes in the country.

A postal code is made up of the country code "MSR" and four digits: these represent the parish, the postal district, and the final two the distribution area or PO box range.

There are eight postcodes in use, one for each sub post office:

References

External links
 

Communications in Montserrat
Montserrat